Thornton is a surname found in Ireland and Britain.

Overview

Found in Britain as an English and Scottish surname derived from places so named in Buckinghamshire, Cheshire, Fife, Merseyside, Lancashire, Leicestershire, Lincolnshire, London, Pembrokeshire, Yorkshire. Its basic form denotes a settlement ('tun') of some sort beside a thorn tree or hedge of thorns .

In Ireland, it is an Anglicised form of a number of Gaelic-Irish surnames which have nothing to do with the British placenames. "[Thornton] is a portmanteau English name for Ó Droighneáin, Mac Sceacháin, Ó Toráin. The connection is: draighean, blackthorn; sceach, whitethorn; tor, a bush. MacLysaght remarks that some Thorntons in Limerick were 16 cent planters." . Ó Droighneáin remains in use as an Irish-language surname.

Bearers of the surname
Abraham Thornton
Al Thornton, basketball player
Alfred Thornton (1853–1906), English footballer from the 1870s
Alice Thornton (1626–1707), British autobiographer
Alvin Thornton
Andre Thornton (born 1949), American baseball player
Andrew Thornton, pro jockey
Andrew C. Thornton II
Anne Jane Thornton, cabin boy and ship's cook
Anne Thornton (born 1981), American pastry chef
Archibald Thornton
A. G. Thornton novelist and journalist
Sadik Hakim (born Argonne Thornton, 1919–1983) American jazz pianist and composer
Barry Thornton, RAF officer
Barry Thornton (cricketer) (born 1941), Australian cricketer
Big Mama Thornton, musician
Billy Bob Thornton (born 1955), American actor
Bonnell Thornton, parodist
Bret Thornton
Bruce Thornton, classicist
Bruce Thornton (cornerback)
Cecilia Dart-Thornton
Charley Thornton
David Thornton (musician), British euphonium player
David Thornton (actor), actor and husband to Cyndi Lauper
David Thornton (American football), linebacker for the Tennessee Titans
De'mario Monte Thornton, real name of Raz-B, member of boy band B2K
 Edward Thornton (disambiguation)
Eleanor Velasco Thornton, actress and model
Elizabeth Thornton, writer
Flora L. Thornton
Frank Thornton (1921–2013), English actor
George Thornton (disambiguation)
Glenys Thornton, Baroness Thornton
Grant Thornton
Henry Thornton (disambiguation)
Henry Thornton (abolitionist), campaigner against the slave trade
Henry Thornton (railroader), president of Canadian National Railway
Hugh Thornton (American football) (born 1991), American football player
James Thornton (disambiguation)
James Thornton (naval officer) (1826–1875)
James Worth Thornton, businessman and son of Sir Henry Worth Thornton
Jim Thornton
Joe Thornton, NHL hockey player
John Thornton (disambiguation)
John L. Thornton
John R. Thornton
John Wingate Thornton, lawyer, historian, author
John Thornton (philanthropist)
Kalen Thornton
Kate Thornton, English television presenter
Kathryn Thornton, astronaut
Keith Thornton, hip hop artist Kool Keith
Kelly Thornton, Irish actress
Kelly Thornton, Canadian theatre director and dramaturge
Kevin Thornton (chef), Irish Michelin starred chef
Kevin Thornton (footballer), Irish footballer
Khyri Thornton (born 1989), American football player
Kirk Thornton
Kristin Thornton
Lawrence Thornton
Leslie Thornton, American filmmaker and artist
Leslie Thornton (sculptor) (1925–2016), English sculptor
Lou Thornton, former major league baseball player
Louise Thornton
Malcolm Thornton
Marcia Thornton Jones, best-selling children's author
Marcus Thornton (disambiguation)
Mark Thornton
Matt Thornton (disambiguation)
Matthew Thornton, first president of New Hampshire House of Representatives
Melanie Thornton, musician
Melody Thornton
Merle Thornton, Australian feminist activist
Michael Thornton (disambiguation)
Michael B. Thornton
 Omar Thornton, murderer of 8 and suicide, see Hartford Distributors shooting
 Patricia H. Thornton (born 1960s), American organizational theorist
Paul Thornton, Live Events Producer
Randy Thornton
 Richard Thornton, millionaire 'Duke of Danzig'
Robert Thornton (disambiguation)
Robert Thornton, jockey
Robert L. Thornton
Robert Lyster Thornton
Robert Stirton Thornton
Roger Thornton
Samantha Thornton (born 1966), Australian basketball player
Samuel Thornton (disambiguation)
Sara Thornton (disambiguation)
Sarah L. Thornton (born 1965), cultural sociologist
Scott Thornton, ice hockey player
Sean Thornton
Shawn Thornton, ice hockey player
Sigrid Thornton, Australian actress
Simon Thornton
Sidney Thornton (1954-2023), American football player
Terrence Thornton (born 1977), birth name of American rapper and record executive Pusha T
Tex Thornton
Tiffany Thornton, American actress
 Tim Thornton (bishop) (born 1957), Bishop of Truro, and of Sherborne
 Tim Thornton (double bassist) (born 1988), British jazz double bassist
 Tim Thornton (musician, born 1973), English drummer, guitarist and novelist
 Tim Thornton (philosopher) (born 1966), British philosopher
Trent Thornton, American baseball player
Tyquan Thornton
Walter Thornton
Walter Thornton (cricketer), English cricketer
Warwick Thornton, Australian cinematographer and director
William Thornton, architect
William E. Thornton, astronaut
William Patton Thornton, doctor
William Wheeler Thornton, Judge, Deputy Attorney General of Indiana, author, and State Supreme Court Librarian
 William Thomas Thornton, British economist, author, civil servant
Willie Thornton
Zach Thornton
 Zack Thornton (born 1988), American baseball player

Fictional characters
Sean Thornton, a character portrayed by John Wayne in The Quiet Man

First name
Thornton Wilder, American playwright

English-language surnames
Surnames of Old English origin
English toponymic surnames